Paucarpata District is one of the twenty-nine districts of the Arequipa Province in Peru.  It is noted for its terraced agricultural hills, called andenes in Spanish.

External links
  www.munipaucarpata.gob.pe Official district web site

References

Districts of the Arequipa Province
Districts of the Arequipa Region